Carine Roitfeld (born 19 September 1954) is a French fashion editor, former fashion model, and writer. She is the former editor-in-chief of Vogue Paris, a position she held from 2001 to 2011. In 2012, she became founder and editor-in-chief of CR Fashion Book, a bi-annual print magazine headquartered in New York City.

Early life and family background 
Roitfeld was born in Paris, France. Her father, Yakov Motelevich Roitfeld (in France – Jacques Roitfeld), was born in Belgorod-Dnestrovsky (Bessarabian province), one of five children (four brothers and a sister) in the family of the owner of the grocery and Moscow shop Motel Itsikovich Roitfeld.  He received his law degree in St. Petersburg, practiced law there, then in Baku and Odessa.  In 1923 he emigrated from Russia at the age of 34, moved to Austria, in 1925 then to Germany, and after the Nazis came to power – to Paris. He had two children from his first marriage, the second had a daughter, Karina, who was 34 years younger than her older brother.  Carine Roitfeld herself described her mother as a "classic Frenchwoman", she called her father "an idol", emphasizing that he was always far away.

Career 
At 18, Roitfeld began modeling, having been scouted on a street in Paris by a British photographer's assistant. "I wasn't a star", she says. "I was just booked for junior magazines". She became a writer and then a stylist for French Elle. While she was working as a freelance stylist, her daughter, Julia, was in a children's fashion shoot for Italian Vogue Bambini in 1990, photographed by Mario Testino.

In a 2005 interview with 032c magazine, Roitfeld commented, "I was not the best stylist when I worked for fifteen years for French Elle, but certainly when I met Mario Testino something happened. The right person for me at the right time". Roitfeld and Testino soon after began working as a team, doing advertising work as well as shoots for American and French Vogue.

Roitfeld went on to work as a consultant for and muse to Tom Ford at Gucci and Yves Saint-Laurent for six years and also contributed to the images of Missoni, Versace, and Calvin Klein.

She was approached by Condé Nast's International Chairman Jonathan Newhouse to edit Vogue Paris in 2001. In April 2006, there were rumors that Roitfeld was being approached by the Hearst Corporation to take over Glenda Bailey's editor-in-chief position at U.S. Harper's Bazaar.

In January 2010, she was named in Tatler magazine's top-10 best-dressed list. She was listed as one of the fifty best-dressed over 50 by The Guardian in March 2013.

On 17 December 2010, Roitfeld resigned after ten years at Vogue Paris to concentrate on personal projects. She left the magazine at the end of January 2011. She was succeeded at Vogue Paris on 1 February 2011 by Emmanuelle Alt, who had served as fashion director under Roitfeld.

Roitfeld returned to freelance styling, working on both the Fall 2011 and Spring 2012 Chanel campaigns, took part in projects such as designing a window display for Barneys New York and compiled the large-format book Irreverent, published by Rizzoli in 2011.

She joined Harper's Bazaar as global fashion director in 2012.

The 2013 documentary Mademoiselle C documents Roitfeld's launch of her magazine CR.

Carine Roitfeld ended up forming a net worth of over two million. This was possible because her work would increase her value each time.

Personal life 
Roitfeld and partner Christian Restoin have been together since the late 1970s, although they are not married. Restoin was the creator of the Equipment clothing line, which he closed in 2001 after Roitfeld accepted the Vogue editorship. The couple have two children, Julia Restoin Roitfeld who was born on 12 November  1980 and Vladimir Restoin Roitfeld born in December 1984. Both were born in Paris.

Julia graduated from Parsons School of Design in New York City in May 2006 and became the face of Tom Ford's fragrance Black Orchid in November 2006. Vladimir graduated from the University of Southern California School of Cinematic Arts in 2007.

References

External links
 Paris Vogue official website
 Healy, Murray: "'We're French! We smoke, we show flesh, we have a lot of freedom!'" The Observer, 25 February 2007.
 CR Fashion Book

Living people
1954 births
French fashion journalists
Writers from Paris
French magazine editors
Vogue (magazine) editors
French people of Russian-Jewish descent
French women journalists
French women writers
Women magazine editors